Maurice Journeau (17 November 1898 – 9 June 1999) was a French composer born in Biarritz. He composed from 1921 to 1984. He died in Versailles.

Works
Works for piano
Valse
Deux mélodies
Fugue
Quatuor à cordes
Sur l'Etang
Pièces enfantines
Ronde enfantine
Humoresque
Suite pour les jeunes
Divertissement pour deux pianos
Simple Cantilène
Le Furet
Toccata
Impromptus

External links
Maurice Journeau

1898 births
1999 deaths
People from Biarritz
École Normale de Musique de Paris alumni
20th-century classical composers
French classical composers
French male classical composers
French centenarians
20th-century French composers
20th-century French male musicians
Men centenarians